Corr na Móna (anglicized as Cornamona) is a village and townland in County Galway, Ireland. It is part of the Gaeltacht (Irish-speaking region) in Joyce Country, and of the possible future geopark.

The village lies on the north of Lough Corrib in the middle of the Joyce Country Mountain and Lake Districts. It is a popular site among trout and salmon anglers.

The eastern edge of the area comes down to the shores of the Corrib while the western edge borders the upland area of An Mám, the Maam Valley and the Maumturk Mountains.

The local secondary school is Coláiste Naomh Feichín, Corr na Móna.

The village also has a shop, Lowry's, a pub, Tí Mhaille / O’Malleys, a playground,a pier and a community centre.

Corr na Móna was used as the filming location for Foscadh, an Irish language film released in 2021.

Notable people
 Mick Molloy — earned 27 caps playing rugby for Ireland from 1967–73; served as the IRB's first medical officer from 2005–2010.
 Éamon Ó Cuív, Teachta Dála, lives in Cornamona.

See also
 List of towns and villages in Ireland

References

External links
Cornamona Information Site
Cornamona Info and Image

Gaeltacht places in County Galway
Towns and villages in County Galway
Gaeltacht towns and villages